The Government Delegation for Poland was an agency of the Polish Government in Exile during World War II. It was the highest authority of the Polish Secret State in occupied Poland and was headed by the Government Delegate for Poland, a de facto deputy Polish Prime Minister.

The Government Delegation for Poland was intended as the first provisional government of war torn Poland until the Exiled Polish Government could safely return from abroad to a liberated Poland.

History
Initially there were two Delegations formed, one for the Polish areas annexed by Germany, and one for the General Government. A delegate for the Polish areas annexed by the Soviet Union was never appointed. From 1942, power was consolidated and there was only one delegate chosen, in the rank of deputy prime minister. He in turn had 6 deputies for each of the regions, whose responsibilities were further delegated to county-level officers. In July 1944 the delegate's three deputies were promoted to ministers, and a Home Council of Ministers (Krajowa Rada Ministrów) was created. The Home Council became the local counterpart of the Polish Government in Exile.

The Delegation's political body was the Political Consultative Committee (Polityczny Komitet Porozumiewawczy), a council comprising 4 main political parties. On 21 March 1943 it was renamed the Home Political Representation (Krajowa Reprezentacja Polityczna) and became an underground coalition parliament, comprising members of the Polish Socialist Party, National Party, People's Party and Labor Party. It became the controlling body of the Delegation and the Headquarters of the Home Army (Armia Krajowa). On 9 January 1944 it was turned into a Council of National Unity (Rada Jedności Narodowej), the parliament of underground Poland.

During Operation Tempest, in 1944, the Council's local representatives and local Home Army commanders, as the representatives of the legitimate Polish government and the Polish Army, emerged from underground and welcomed the advancing Red Army. Despite several instances of successful cooperation with the Soviet Union, most of the Polish representatives and commanders were soon arrested by the NKVD and sent to Russian prisons or to the Gulag.

During the Warsaw Uprising, the central Government Delegation for Poland likewise came out of hiding and began acting officially as the Polish parliament in the liberated areas of Poland. After the Uprising's suppression, most of the Delegation's members left Warsaw with the civilian population and managed to evade the Germans. However, contact with local branches in Soviet- and German-occupied areas was broken.

In February 1945, the Government Delegation including most members of the Council of National Unity and the Home Army Commander-in-Chief, were invited by Soviet General Ivan Serov to a conference on their eventual inclusion in the Soviet-backed Provisional Government. They were promised safe conduct beforehand but immediately arrested by the NKVD, and brought to Moscow, where they were brutally tortured for several months and tried in a staged Trial of the Sixteen. All perished. Meanwhile, in Poland, the Delegation was reconstructed and continued in its duties until finally disbanded on 1 July 1945.

Departments
The Delegation's activities encompassed all areas of organized society. It comprised 12 branches, roughly corresponding to the ministries of the Polish government-in-exile in London.

Internal Affairs
 Security of the Delegation
 Provisional Administration - shadow administration to take over the administrational duties after liberation or during an all-national uprising
 Państwowy Korpus Bezpieczeństwa -underground police
 Council to Aid the Jews
 preparing reports on the situation in occupied Poland
 Information and Press
 providing the society with news from abroad
 propaganda
 printing Rzeczpospolita, the official organ of the Office
 Labour and Social Affairs
 cooperation with Polish Red Cross and Central Welfare Council
 Education and Culture
 Organisation of the Underground schools and universities
 Industry and Trade
 Agriculture
 Justice
 Liquidation of the Effects of the War
 Public Works and Reconstruction
 Treasury
 Post Offices and Telegraphs
 Communications

Near the end of the war, Departments of Foreign Affairs and of War Matters were created, but they have not played any significant role.

Other notable units and bureaus included:
 Bureau of the Newly Acquired Lands (Polish Biuro Ziem Nowych)
 Established 1942. The Bureau's main task was to document the Polish claims on German lands east of the Oder river and the area of Prussia as well as planning of their post-war development. Despite the Allies agreement to grant Poland with the lands east of the Oder–Neisse line, the plans of the bureau were never fulfilled since most of its workers were arrested by the NKVD and sent to Gulags across Russia (see, however, Recovered Territories).
 Kierownictwo Walki Cywilnej (Directorate of Civil Resistance) (since 1941)

With regard to territorial structure, there were:
 in General Government:
 Regional Delegation for Kielce
 Regional Delegation for Kraków
 Regional Delegation for Lublin
 Regional Delegation for Warsaw-City
 Regional Delegation for Warsaw-voivodeship
 in the Polish territories annexed by Nazi Germany:
 Regional Delegation for Ciechanów
 Regional Delegation for Łódź
 Regional Delegation for Pomorze (Pomerania) in Toruń
 Regional Delegation for Poznań
 Regional Delegation for Śląsk (Silesia) in Katowice
 in the Polish territories annexed by the Soviet Union:
 Regional Delegation for Białystok
 Regional Delegation for Lwów (Lviv)
 Regional Delegation for Nowogródek (Navahrudak)
 Regional Delegation for Polesie
 Regional Delegation for Wilno (Vilnius)
 Regional Delegation for Wołyń (Volhynia)

See also
World War II
Participants in World War II
List of Government Delegates for Poland
Armed Forces Delegation for Poland

References

 
 
Grzegorz Ostasz, The Polish Government-in-Exile's Home Delegature

Poland in World War II
Polish Underground State